Urteaga is a Basque surname which may refer to the following:

 Benito Urteaga (1946–1976), Argentinian Marxist revolutionary 
 Irma Urteaga (1929–2022), Argentinian composer and pianist 
 Juan de Urteaga (died 1540), bishop of Chiapas, Mexico
 Luis Alberto Urteaga (born 1960), Uruguayan modern pentathlete, competitor in the 1992 Summer Olympics
 Mario Urteaga Alvarado (1875–1957), Peruvian painter

References

Basque-language surnames